Astroblepus eigenmanni is a species of catfish of the family Astroblepidae. It can be found on Ecuador.

Named in honor of Carl H. Eigenmann (1863-1927), who loaned specimens to Regan.

References

Astroblepus
Catfish of South America
Freshwater fish of Ecuador
Endemic fauna of Ecuador
Fish described in 1904
Taxa named by Charles Tate Regan